Reichardia is a genus of plants in the tribe Cichorieae within the family Asteraceae native to the Mediterranean and western Asia. In Crete, Greece the leaves and tender shoots of a variety of Reichardia picroides called  are eaten raw, boiled, cooked in steam or browned with olive oil by the locals. Brighteyes is a common name for plants in this genus.

 Species

References

External links
 
 

Asteraceae genera
Cichorieae
Leaf vegetables